The Colorado Mammoth are a lacrosse team based in Denver, Colorado playing in the National Lacrosse League (NLL). The 2022 season is the 35th in franchise history and 19th as the Mammoth (previously the Washington Power, Pittsburgh Crossefire, and Baltimore Thunder).

Final standings

Regular season

Playoffs

Roster

Entry Draft
The 2021 NLL Entry Draft took place on August 28, 2021. The Mammoth made the following selections:

See also
2022 NLL season

References

Colorado
Colorado Mammoth seasons
Colorado Mammoth